Gumada is a village and Gram panchayat located in Komarada mandal in Vizianagaram district in Andhra Pradesh, India.

Gumada railway station is very close to mandal headquarters Komarada. Gumada station is located on Vizianagaram-Raipur railway.

Demographics
 census, Gumada village has demographics as below:
 Total Population - 1,296 in 330 households.
 Male Population - 636
 Female Population - 660
 Children under 6-years of age - 202 (Boys - 102 and Girls - 100)
 Total Literates - 428
 slowly developing village.
 MBA graduates also there in that village(3 members)

References

Famous Sri Rama Lingeswara swamy shrine available.

Villages in Vizianagaram district